I Care may refer to:

 I Care (album), a 2006 album by Rachelle Ann Go
 "I Care" (Tom T. Hall song), 1974
 "I Care" (Beyoncé song), 2012

See also
 Eye care
 İcarə, the former name of Eçara, a village in the Jalilabad Rayon of Azerbaijan
 Ikare, a city in the northern part of Ondo State, Nigeria